Jane Hart may refer to:
 Jane Hart (writer), American writer and activist in Kentucky
 Jane Briggs Hart, aviator
 Jane K. Hart, professor of physical geography
 Jane Hart (artist), American curator, gallerist and artist